The 1881–82 season was the 4th season of West Bromwich Albion Football Club. For this season only, Albion played their home matches at their third ground, Bunn's Field, which became known as The Birches. 1881–82 was Albion's first season of competitive football: the club entered the Birmingham Senior Cup for the first time, reaching the semi-finals.

Birmingham Senior Cup

Albion took part in the Birmingham Senior Cup for the first time and were drawn away from home in the first four rounds. The club played their first recorded competitive match on 12 November 1881, winning 3–2 against Calthorpe. Albion then defeated Elwells and Fallings Heath, though the goalscorers for the first three rounds were not recorded. There followed a 5–2 fourth round victory over Notts Rangers. The semi-final took place at Aston Lower Grounds and was against Wednesbury Old Athletic. Billy Bisseker and Harry Aston scored for Albion but Wednesbury won 3–2.

Source for match details:

Friendly matches

With league football yet to be established, West Bromwich Albion took part in a number of friendly matches throughout the season. Billy Bisseker scored five goals in the 12–0 win against Milton. The record of the club's matches during their early years is not complete, thus several of the scores are missing.

Source for match details:

See also
1881–82 in English football

Footnotes

References 
Citations

Sources

West Bromwich Albion F.C. seasons
West Bromwich Albion